Sentinel Nunatak is a high, black, pyramid-shaped nunatak at the mouth of Drygalski Glacier, on Nordenskjöld Coast in Graham Land, Antarctica. Charted by the Falkland Islands Dependencies Survey (FIDS) in 1947 and so named because of its commanding position at the mouth of Drygalski Glacier.

Nunataks of Graham Land
Nordenskjöld Coast